Rodrigo Ribeiro Souto (born September 9, 1983) is a retired Brazilian footballer who playsedas a defensive midfielder. He has previously played for several Brazilian clubs as well as in Japan.

Playing career
Born in Rio de Janeiro, Rodrigo was a product of São Cristóvão youth (along with others such as Brazilian superstar forward Ronaldo). He earned a transfer to Vasco da Gama at only 17 years of age. Souto built his career in Vasco, initially playing as a defensive midfielder. However, the team back then put many players in that position on the lineup, and so Rodrigo was able to show his attacking skills. He then began to be deployed as a right attacking midfielder.

In such position, he made a move to Atlético Paranaense. Although he conquered Paraná State League in 2005, he did not establish himself as a regular and, after six months, switched clubs again, this time to Figueirense. There he again won the State league and again was deployed as a defensive midfielder, and even as a right back or sweeper in emergencies.

Santos
Souto's performance at Figueirense in 2006 earned him a transfer to Santos where he made a solid pairing with Chilean international, Claudio Maldonado. He was once again State League champion in 2007, with a really high grade on the final game. He had a great year with Santos in 2007, also finishing 2nd in the Série A.

In 2008, Santos did not perform well in all competitions but Souto continued as a first-choice player in the midfield. In 2009 Santos improved and Souto played well in the beginning of the Série A, scoring two headed goals against Goiás in the first round of the League. Santos however could not qualify for the Copa Libertadores of 2010.

São Paulo
Souto moved to São Paulo from Santos in 2010, as a deal with midfielder Arouca. He fit well into the squad and played good matches for São Paulo.

Retirement
In September 2018 it was confirmed, that Souto had decided to retire.

Honours
Vasco da Gama
Rio de Janeiro State League: 2003

Atlético Paranaense
Paraná State League: 2005

Figueirense
Santa Catarina State League: 2006

Santos
São Paulo State League: 2007

References

External links

 CBF
 samabfoot
 santos.globo.com

1983 births
Living people
Brazilian footballers
Brazilian expatriate footballers
Campeonato Brasileiro Série A players
Campeonato Brasileiro Série B players
J1 League players
São Cristóvão de Futebol e Regatas players
CR Vasco da Gama players
Club Athletico Paranaense players
Figueirense FC players
Santos FC players
São Paulo FC players
Júbilo Iwata players
Clube Náutico Capibaribe players
Botafogo de Futebol e Regatas players
Clube Atlético Penapolense players
Resende Futebol Clube players
Olaria Atlético Clube players
Association football midfielders
Brazilian expatriate sportspeople in Japan
Expatriate footballers in Japan
Footballers from Rio de Janeiro (city)